Elizabeth Baron (born 1910) was an Australian screenwriter who worked in the British film industry in the 1940s, collaborating with directors such as Maurice Elvey.

Selected filmography 

 Dick Barton Strikes Back (1949)
 Beware of Pity (1946)
 Strawberry Roan (1944)
 Medal for the General (1944)
 The Gay Intruders (1944)
 The Lamp Still Burns (1943)
 The Gentle Sex (1943)
 Mr Bunting at War (1942)
 Salute John Citizen (1942)

References

External links

1910 births
Possibly living people
Australian expatriates in the United Kingdom
Australian screenwriters
Australian women screenwriters